Thorpe on the Hill (or Thorpe) is a small village in West Yorkshire, England. The village falls within the Ardsley and Robin Hood ward of the Leeds Metropolitan Council. It was mentioned as "Torp" in the Domesday Book together with neighbouring Carlton, Lofthouse, Middleton, and Rothwell as part of the Morley Hundred in the West Riding.

It is split by the M62 Motorway, and is close to the M1 and the Lofthouse Interchange (Junction 29 - Junction 42).

Thorpe Hall on Middleton Lane is a Grade II* listed building.

See also
Listed buildings in Leeds (Ardsley and Robin Hood Ward)

References

External links
   The Ancient Parish of Rothwell at Genuki: Thorpe on the Hill was in this parish

Places in Leeds
Rothwell, West Yorkshire